Günther's emo skink or olive small-scaled skink (Emoia lawesii) is a species of skink. It is found in Niue, Samoa, and Tonga.

References

Emoia
Reptiles described in 1874
Taxa named by Albert Günther
Taxobox binomials not recognized by IUCN